Miccolamia tuberculata is a species of beetle in the family Cerambycidae. It was described by Pic in 1918. It is known from Japan.

References

Desmiphorini
Beetles described in 1918